Jan Čelůstka (born 22 March 1982) is a Czech triathlete.

At the 2012 Summer Olympics men's triathlon on Tuesday 7 August he placed 30th.

References 

1982 births
Living people
Czech male triathletes
Olympic triathletes of the Czech Republic
Triathletes at the 2012 Summer Olympics
20th-century Czech people
21st-century Czech people